Yousef Mohammad (born 26 June 1999) is a Syrian footballer who plays as a centre-back for Bangladesh Premier League club Abahani Limited Dhaka and the Syria national team.

Club career 
In summer 2021, Mohammad moved to Bahraini Premier League side Al-Ahli Manama.

References

External links
 
 
 

1999 births
Living people
People from Al-Hasakah
Syrian footballers
Association football central defenders
Al-Wahda SC (Syria) players
Al-Ahli Club (Manama) players
Al-Jaish Damascus players
Abahani Limited (Dhaka) players
Syrian Premier League players
Bahraini Premier League players
Bangladesh Football Premier League players
Syria youth international footballers
Syria international footballers
Syrian expatriate footballers
Syrian expatriate sportspeople in Bahrain
Syrian expatriate sportspeople in Bangladesh
Expatriate footballers in Bahrain
Expatriate footballers in Bangladesh